Royal Thanlyin Football Club()  is a Burmese football club, founded in 2015. This is the third MNL-2 season of Royal Thanlyin FC. City Stars FC changed their name to Royal Thanlyin and based on Thanlyin, Yangon.

Current squad

References

External links
 First Eleven Journal in Burmese
 Soccer Myanmar in Burmese

Association football clubs established in 2009
Myanmar National League clubs
2009 establishments in Myanmar
Football clubs in Myanmar